Fortunato Bartolomeo de Felice (24 August 1723 – 13 February 1789), 2nd Comte de Panzutti, also known as Fortuné-Barthélemy de Félice and  Francesco Placido Bartolomeo De Felice, was an Italian nobleman, a famed author, philosopher, scientist, and is said to have been one of the most important publishers of the 18th century. He is considered a pioneer of education in Switzerland, and a formative contributor to the European Enlightenment.

Life
Fortunato Bartolomeo de Félice was born in Rome to a Neapolitan family, as the eldest of six children, on 24 August 1723. He was confirmed in 1733 in the parish of St. Celso e Giuliano. At the age of 12, he studied at Rome and Naples under the Jesuits, taught by the Franciscan Fortunato da Brescia.

On 28 May 1746 he was ordained by papal dispensation, whilst also teaching philosophy. Through his studies at the monastery of San Francesco in Ripa, he discovered a love of physics, becoming friends with Celestino Galiani. In 1753, Galiani appointed de Félice chair of Ancient and Modern Geography, and the chair of experimental physics and mathematics at Naples University. There he became friends with the Prince Raimondo di Sangro who aided him in his translation of the physicist John Arbuthnot's works from Latin.

After rescuing the imprisoned Countess Panzutti, Félice and his new wife Agnese fled to Bern, with the help of his friend Albrecht von Haller, due to religious persecution from the Roman Catholic Church in Rome. He then converted to Protestantism.

In 1758, he founded with :de:Vincenz Bernhard Tscharner the Typographic Society of Bern, which was an Italian-speaking ( l'Estratto de la europea letterature until 1762) and a Latin (to 1766) literary and scientific journal.

In 1762, after the death of the Countessa di Panzutti due to influenza at Tscharner's residence, Château Lansitz, de Felice moved to Yverdon where he founded an educational institute for young people from all over Europe, and a printing press. The latter quickly developed into one of the most distinguished in Switzerland, producing the Yverdon Encyclopedia, for which Panzutti is now famous. In 1769 he became a citizen of Yverdon, and thereby became Swiss.

He was married four times and had 13 children: in 1756 to Countess Agnese Arcuato, Countessa di Panzutti (1720–1759) (whereby his earldom was received suo jure, so Arcuato's previous husband was recorded as the first Count Panzutti), in 1759 to Susanne de Wavre Neuchâtel (1737–1769), in 1769 to Louise Marie Perrelet (died 1774), and in 1774 to Jeanne Salomé Sinet.

He died in Yverdon-les-Bains.

Work
De Felice is considered a significant contributor to education in Switzerland. As editor and translator of Burlamaqui's Principes du Droit Naturel, his name became synonymous with natural law throughout Europe. His most important work is the Encyclopédie d'Yverdon, which he headed as editor and for which he wrote more than 800 articles. From 1770 to 1780 he published 58 volumes, and as the Encyclopédie of Paris had a new version of the Protestant perspective.

His other work consists of half a dozen educational, philosophical and scientific books. He translated the works of René Descartes, d'Alembert, Maupertuis and Newton into Italian.

In de Felice's famous printing house, as well as the Encyclopedia, he translated into French works of Elie Bertrand, Charles Bonnet, Jean-Jacques Burlamaqui, Albrecht von Haller, Gabriel Seigneux de Correvon, Samuel-Auguste Tissot, Johann Joachim Winckelmann and other Enlightenment authors.

The two magazine projects of the Typographic Society Bern aimed at an international exchange of knowledge. This allowed Tscharner and de Felice to create a correspondent network all over Europe.

Portrait
An 18th-century depiction of de Félice is held by the Achenbach Foundation in the San Francisco Museum of Fine Arts. A Latin and 18th century French inscription by one of his sons, Carolus de Félice reads:

He also had a portrait commissioned, done by an unknown artist. The current holder of the portrait, the de Felice Duchi Estate, puts this painting as the best representation of de Felice in existence.

Works 
 Etrennes aux désœuvrés ou Lettre d'Quaker à ses frères et à un grand docteur. 1766th (In this work Felice railed against the so-called philosophers and Voltaire )
 Mémoires de la Société oeconomique de Berne (24 volumes, 1763–72)
 Essay manière la plus sûre d'un système de police établir of grains. Yverdon 1772nd
 Dictionnaire géographique, historique et politique de la Suisse. 2 vols. Neuchâtel 1775th
 Dictionnaire de justice naturelle et civile. 1778th 13 volumes
 Tableau philosophique de la religion Chrétienne, considérée dans son ensemble dans sa morale et dans ses consolations. Yverdon 1779th
 Eléments de la police générale d'un Etat. Yverdon 1781st
 Le développement de la raison . Oeuvres posthumous. Yverdon 1789th
 Encyclopédie, ou Dictionnaire universel raisonné of connaissances humaines. 42 volumes and 6 supplementary volumes. Yverdon 1770–1776. Reissue: Fischer Verlag, Erlangen 1993,  . (38,000 pages on 257 microfiches.)

Further reading 
 Full Biography and works of Fortunato De Felice
 De Felice Estate Website

Bibliography 
 Encyclopédie, ou, Dictionnaire universel raisonné des connoissances humaines (Yverdon, Switzerland. 42 volumes, 6 volumes Supplement, and 10 volumes of plates, 1770–1780), with the assistance of Leonhard Euler, Charles François Dupuis, Jérôme Lalande, Albrecht von Haller, et al.
 Mémoires de la Société oeconomique de Berne (24 volumes, 1763–72)
 Le Bacha de Bude (1765)
 De Newtonian Attractione, adversus Hambergen (1757)
 Quadro filosofico della religione cristiana (1757)
 Sul modo di formare la mente ed il cuore dei fanciuli (1763)
 Principii del diritto della natura a delle genti (1769)
 Lezioni di logica (1770)
 Elementi del governo interiore di uno stato (1781)

References 

http://art.famsf.org/anonymous/fortunatus-de-felice-19633021935 – Link to the print in the Achenbach Foundation

1723 births
1789 deaths
Italian lexicographers
Italian printers
18th-century Italian Jesuits
Writers from Rome
18th-century Italian writers
18th-century Italian male writers
18th-century Italian scientists
Italian Protestants
Italian Historians
Swiss Writers
Swiss Historians
Former Jesuits
Converts to Protestantism from Roman Catholicism
18th-century lexicographers